Robert Burrows may refer to:

 Robert Burrows (cricketer) (1871–1943), English cricketer
 Robert Burrows (politician) (1884–1964), British businessman and politician

See also 
 Robert Burrowes (Australian politician) (1822–1885)
 Robert Burrowes (Irish politician) (1810–1881)
 Robert Burrowes (priest) (died 1841), Anglican priest in Ireland
 Bob Burrow (1934–2019), American basketball player